Liberty and Refoundation (Libre; libre is the Spanish word for "free") is a left-wing political party in Honduras. Libre was founded in 2011 by the National Popular Resistance Front (FNRP), a leftist coalition of organizations opposed to the 2009 coup.

Xiomara Castro, the wife of former president Manuel Zelaya who was deposed in the 2009 coup, was the presidential candidate of the party in the 2013 presidential election; Zelaya was not allowed to run for a second term under the constitution. Castro took second place in the four-way race, receiving approximately 29 percent of the vote behind Juan Orlando Hernández's 34 percent. Castro has stated that if she won the 2021 presidential election, she would promote democratic socialism and ask the National Congress to draft a new constitution.

At least eighteen Libre pre-candidates, candidates, family members, and campaign leaders were killed between June 2012 and October 2013. Additionally, it is strongly opposed to free market capitalism and the neo-liberal economic model, and maintains a long-term goal of "establishing an alternative economic system."

On 28 November 2021, Xiomara Castro, presidential candidate of Liberty and Refoundation, won 53% of the votes in the presidential election to become the first female president of Honduras.

Factions
There are at least five factions within Liberty and Refoundation. 
28 June Movement (Movimiento 28 de junio)
People's Resistance Movement (Movimiento Resistencia Popular, MRP)
Organized People in Resistance (Pueblo Organizado en Resistencia, POR)
People's Refoundation Force (Fuerza de Refundación Popular, FRP)
5 July Movement (Movimiento 5 de julio)

List of Leader

Electoral history

Presidential elections

National Congress

See also
Communist Party of Honduras
Democratic Unification Party
Innovation and Unity Party
Pink tide

References

2011 establishments in Honduras
Democratic socialist parties in North America
Foro de São Paulo
Political parties established in 2011
Political parties in Honduras
Progressive International
Socialism in Honduras